Royoungia is a fungal genus  in the family Boletaceae. This genus is represented by the type species Royoungia boletoides, which was found in Australia. In 2016, 5 more species were found in China.

The genus was circumscribed by Michael Angelo Castellano, James Martin 'Jim' Trappe and Nicholas Malajczuk in Austral. Syst. Bot. vol.5 (5) on page 614 in 1992.

The genus name of Royoungia is in honour of Roy Young, who was a plant collector of subterranean growing fungi. In 1988 he joined an Expedition in
Queensland, Australia. 

This genus is characterized by the boletoid or gasteroid basidiomata.

Species
As accepted by Species Fungorum;
 Royoungia boletoides 
 Royoungia coccineinana 
 Royoungia grisea 
 Royoungia palumana 
 Royoungia reticulata 
 Royoungia rubina

References

Boletaceae
Boletales genera